Midumidukki is a 1968 Indian Malayalam film, directed by Crossbelt Mani and produced by Ponnappan. The film stars Sathyan, Sharada, Adoor Bhasi and Hari in the lead roles. The film had musical score by M. S. Baburaj.

Cast
Sathyan as Ravi
Sharada as Radha
Adoor Bhasi as Padmanabha Kurup
Hari as Gopan
Sankaradi
Ambika as Saraswati 
Aranmula Ponnamma
Kottarakkara Sreedharan Nair
Rajani

Soundtrack
The music was composed by M. S. Baburaj and the lyrics were written by Sreekumaran Thampi.

References

External links
 

1968 films
1960s Malayalam-language films
Films directed by Crossbelt Mani